The 2014 Svenska Cupen final was played on 18 May 2014 at the national stadium Friends Arena in Solna, which hosted the final for the second time. The stadium is the home of the Sweden national football team and Allsvenskan club AIK. The final made its return to Solna for the second consecutive year. The final was the culmination of the 2013–14 Svenska Cupen.

Road to the Final

Note: In all results below, the score of the finalist is given first.

Match

Details

See also
2013–14 Svenska Cupen

References

External links
Svenska Cupen at svenskfotboll.se

2014
Cup
Helsingborgs IF matches
IF Elfsborg matches
Football in Stockholm
May 2014 sports events in Europe